Baiqiao Tang (born 11 August 1967, Yongzhou; sometimes spelled Tang Boqiao)  is a Chinese political dissident from Hunan province who led student protests during the 1989 democracy movement. After the 1989 Tiananmen Square protests and massacre, Tang fled from agents of the Chinese Communist Party (CCP) who eventually arrested him in the city of Jiangmen. He was charged with being a counter-revolutionary and imprisoned. Upon his release, he fled to Hong Kong, where he co-authored the report Anthems of Defeat: Crackdown in Hunan Province 1989 - 1992 through Human Rights Watch with Dr. Robin Munro of the University of London. Tang was later accepted into the United States as a political refugee in 1992. Tang claimed that he graduated in 2003 with a Master's degree in international affairs from Columbia University, but university archive and registrar of Columbia University claimed that he studied there but did not graduate.

Early life

Tang was born on August 11, 1967 in Yongzhou. He attended Lingling Number Four High School in Hunan, and then Hunan Normal University.

Arrival in the U.S.

Tang arrived in the United States in April, 1992. In June of that year, at a press conference in Washington, D.C., he announced the existence of an underground group called the All-China People's Autonomous Federation. According to Tang, the Federation was, at that time, operating in the People's Republic of China, and consisted mostly of former students who had taken part in the Tiananmen Square protests of 1989. Tang called himself the group's "overseas spokesman." He refused to cite specific members of the group for fear of reprisal by the Chinese Communist Party. The Federation's existence was corroborated by Dr. Robin Munro, who reportedly called the group "extensive and well organized."

Tang was also cited by officials of Asia Watch, a division of Human Rights Watch, for contributing the majority of research to a publication called Anthems of Defeat: Crackdown in Hunan Province 1989 - 1992. The book details some of the harshest punishments and human rights atrocities meted out by the CCP in the wake of Tiananmen Square. Among these were the plight of three Chinese dissidents sentenced up to life imprisonment for hurling paint at an image of Mao Zedong in connection with student protests during the 1989 democracy movement.

Continued activism

Since his escape from China, Tang Baiqiao has remained very active in the pro-democracy movement. In particular, he has called for a reassessment of China's human rights policies (including the number of actual casualties sustained in the Tiananmen Square massacre), an examination of the persecution of Falun Gong practitioners worldwide, support for the Dalai Lama's efforts to negotiate change for Tibet, and an end to the Chinese Communist Party.

Tang is a frequent on-air special commentator for New Tang Dynasty Television. He is a spokesman and officer for the China Interim Government. His articles have appeared in the Journal of International Affairs and Beijing Spring, among other publications.

Retrospective commentary on Tiananmen Square

In 1999, in an interview with Human Rights Watch, Tang stated that, "The 1989 democracy movement and the June 4 crackdown cut off any meaningful movement toward political change." Specifically, he said that public discussion related to political reforms were taking place before the Tiananmen Square protests. Tang noted that the reform efforts of Zhao Ziyang, Bao Tong, and Chen Yizi might well have prevailed had the crackdown never occurred. In essence, Tiananmen Square allowed CCP leaders such as Jiang Zemin to consolidate their power over the Party, the government, and the military.

In the same interview, Tang noted that corruption, not political reform, was the primary concern of student protestors. He pointed out that students also wished to see Hu Yaobang rehabilitated, as well as increased social benefits for intellectuals. Tang maintains that issues of democracy and human rights only emerged in the end stages of Tiananmen Square, and then somewhat tangentially. However, Tang notes that, due to the 1989 movement, the Chinese government has allowed greater economic, social, and cultural freedoms.

2009 assault
On July 6, 2009, Tang Baiqiao suffered a seemingly unprovoked assault by several men at a karaoke bar in Flushing, the Chinatown section of Queens. Tang suffered injuries to his face and hand. He maintains the assault was orchestrated and perpetrated by agents of the CCP, most likely in retaliation against statements he made in defense of Falun Gong practitioners, as well as his support for the Tuidang movement, which encourages renunciation of the CCP. However, Tang admitted his frustration that United States law enforcement were not convinced the attacks came from Communist sources. His claim has never been independently verified.

His version of events was supported by several New York leaders of the Chinese pro-democracy movement. Tang held a press conference at Capitol Hill, Washington, D.C. on July 30, 2009. He denounced the attacks, and called them reminiscent of a similar event that occurred in 2008 where mobs of up to 600 people physically and verbally assaulted Falun Gong members volunteering at a neighborhood community action center.

Publications
Anthems of Defeat: Crackdown in Hunan Province 1989 - 1992, with Robin Munro (1991)

Various articles

My Two Chinas: The Memoir of a Chinese Counterrevolutionary, with Damon DiMarco (2011) from Prometheus Books

Tang wrote the foreword to Peter Navarro's 2011 book Death by China, which highlights the threats to America's economic dominance in the 21st century posed by China's Communist Party.

He is a noted supporter of President Donald Trump.

In 2017 he started a Twitter account that translates to Simplified Chinese all of President Trump's tweets

See also
List of Chinese dissidents

External links

 YouTube video
 Facebook Page
Twitter account
Tangbaiqiao's blog

References

1967 births
Living people
Chinese dissidents
Chinese democracy activists
Chinese human rights activists
1989 Tiananmen Square protesters
Prisoners and detainees of the People's Republic of China